"Open Your Window" is the third single by Reverend and the Makers, from their debut studio album The State of Things.

The song also features on FIFA 09.

Music video
The music video for the song was directed by Scott Jones and Laurence Easeman, and stars Joel Goldberg. Animation was contributed by Martin Lynch.

Track listing

7": (WOS020S)
 A. "Open Your Window"
 B. "Dear Lydia"

 CD: (WOS020CD)
 "Open Your Window"
 "Paris at Night"
 "Open Your Window" (Club)

Charts

References

2007 singles
2007 songs
Reverend and The Makers songs
Wall of Sound (record label) singles
Songs written by Alan Smyth